Callejón Diamante (Diamond Alley) is an important central street in the city of Xalapa in the state of Veracruz in eastern Mexico.

At night the street is often crowded with a bohemian atmosphere and features a number of cafes and shops catering for the arts. It is located near the Callejón Jesús te Ampare, a cobblestone street which connects to the Church of San José of Xalapa.

External links
Leyandas de Xalapa: El Callejón del Diamante  

Xalapa